Sergio Ommel (born 2 September 1977 in The Hague) is a Dutch footballer, who is a professional player, who currently plays for ARC Alphen aan den Rijn.

Career 
Ommel's first senior club was FC Groningen, and from there he moved to Telstar. He joined Icelandic side KR in 2000, for whom he played in the qualifying rounds of the UEFA Champions League, before moving to England to join Bristol Rovers in November 2001. He remained in Bristol until the end of the 2001–02 season, when he traveled back to his home nation and signed for the newly formed Stormvogels Telstar, who were created following the merger of Stormvogels with his old club Telstar. From there he joined amateur club Quick Boys, before moving to Ter Leede in 2007. Next club was S.V. Huizen and for FC Lisse. The forward, was than 2012 signed by ARC Alphen aan den Rijn from  amateur side FC Lisse.

References

External links

1977 births
Living people
Footballers from Haarlem
Association football forwards
Dutch footballers
English Football League players
FC Groningen players
Knattspyrnufélag Reykjavíkur players
Bristol Rovers F.C. players
Dutch expatriate sportspeople in Iceland
SC Telstar players
Expatriate footballers in Iceland
FC Lisse players
SV Huizen players
Dutch expatriate footballers
Expatriate footballers in England
Expatriate footballers in Cyprus
APOP Kinyras FC players
Quick Boys players
Cypriot First Division players
Ter Leede players